The "State Anthem of Turkmenistan", also known as the "National Anthem of Independent Neutral Turkmenistan", was adopted as the national anthem of Turkmenistan in 1996, then again with modified lyrics in 2008. The music was composed by Turkmenistani composer Veli Mukhatov, who also composed the music of the Turkmen SSR's regional anthem.

The lyrics were originally written by the first president of Turkmenistan, Saparmurat Niyazov (also known as Turkmenbashi), who died on 21 December 2006. Less than two years after his death, the reference to Turkmenbashi in the chorus was replaced with "the people", and both the third and final verse and the chorus at the start of the piece were removed. The national anthem is played at the start of radio and television broadcasts at 6:55 a.m. local time and played again when radio and television stations sign off.

History
Until 1996, Turkmenistan, which received independence a few years earlier, used the Turkmen SSR anthem without words as the state anthem. The new anthem was adopted on 27 September 1996 by the People's Council of Turkmenistan in Bayramali. The anthem, known by the first sentence of the chorus, "The great creation of Turkmenbashi", in reference to the first leader, Saparmurat Niyazov, was used from 1997 to 2008, when it was given minor changes when his successor, Gurbanguly Berdimuhamedow, ordered to do so following Niyazov's death in 2006.

Lyrics

Current Version

1997–2008 Version

Notes

References

External links
Turkmenistan: Garaşsyz, Bitarap Türkmenistanyň Döwlet Gimni - Audio of the national anthem of Turkmenistan, with information and lyrics (archive link)
Instrumental version of "Independent, Neutral, Turkmenistan State Anthem" in RealAudio
Ruhnama - Songs and Video Clips (archive link) - This website dedicated to the Ruhnama features a page with a vocal version of the National Anthem, as well as other songs and video clips.

Turkmenistan
Turkmenistan music
National symbols of Turkmenistan
National anthem compositions in F major